Homer City Generating Station is a 2-GW coal-burning power station near Homer City, in Indiana County, Pennsylvania, USA. It is majority-owned by General Electric and operated by NRG Energy. Units 1 and 2, rated at 660 MWe, began operation in 1969. Unit 3, rated at 692 MWe nameplate capacity, was launched  in 1977. It employs about 260 people, and generates enough electricity to supply two million households.

The facility's owners are considering deactivating some of its units, and will make a final decision by April of 2022.

Location
The site also includes the  Two Lick Reservoir, a water conservation facility which is operated by the station.

Coal supply
But now with diminishing local coal and mines to support it, the train track that runs through Indiana University of Pennsylvania has reopened and now supplies are brought in by train.

History
Until its construction in the 1960s by the Pennsylvania Electric Co. (PenElec) and others, much of the property was owned by the George family. In 1969, Units #1 and #2 began operation, while Unit #3 began operating in 1977.

In 2001, affiliates of General Electric bought the plant from Edison International, and subsequently leased it back to them. In 2011, Edison failed to secure financing to add pollution-control devices and announced plans to transfer full control to General Electric. On February 29, 2012, Edison took a $1 billion impairment charge related to the Homer City plant and several other coal-fired power plants. At the end of 2012 full control of the plant was transferred back to General Electric, which hired an NRG affiliate to operate it.

In early 2017, the plant filed for bankruptcy protection.

Water use

From there, the Black Lick enters the Conemaugh River, which goes on to meet the Loyalhanna River, creating the Kiskiminetas River, before entering the Allegheny River.

Pollution
A scrubber was added in 1998 which reduced mercury output. In 2012, General Electric, through contractors, began construction of anti-pollution control equipment known as "scrubbers" to further reduce the plant's emissions.

Sulfur dioxide (SO2) pollution
 In 1995, Homer City discharged  of SO2.
 In 2003, Homer City discharged  of SO2 and was ranked  the fourth-largest SO2 polluter in the nation.
 In 2005, the facility was ranked as the nation's sixth-highest SO2 polluter as it discharged only 119,771 pounds (54.327 metric tons) of SO2 that year.

Selenium in wastewater discharges
In 2007, the Pennsylvania Department of Environmental Protection (DEP) fined the owners of the Homer City electricity generating station, EME Homer City Generation LP, $200,000 for violating the Pennsylvania Clean Streams Law. The station exceeded its permitted effluent standards for selenium, total suspended solids, and biochemical oxygen demand in its wastewater discharges, and allowed discharges of stormwater associated with its flue-gas desulfurization scrubbers.

Oxides of Nitrogen (NOx)
Homer City's three coal boilers installed Selective Catalytic Reduction to reduce ozone-forming NOx emissions in 2000 and 2001.  This technology produced up to an 83% reduction in NOx emissions in subsequent years.  Since the optimum years of 2005-06, emissions have begun to creep back up towards what they were before the installation of this technology.  During the summer of 2012 plant emissions of NOx doubled over the 2005-06 period from 2,300 tons to 4,500 tons, even as electrical generation fell by 30%.  Through this same period, the price of natural gas, which competes with coal as a fuel for electrical generation, fell by some 60%.  Through the 2013 summer ozone season, this trend in rising emission rates continued resulting in over 6,300 tons of NOx emissions in excess of what could have been achieved had the plant operated at its previously demonstrated optimum rates seen in 2005-06.

Architectural mention

The plant's Unit 3 has a 371 m (1,217 ft) tall chimney, which was built in 1977. This chimney is currently the third-tallest chimney in the world, the second-tallest in North America, and the tallest in the United States. On clear days, it is possible to spot the chimney from as far south as Greensburg, Pennsylvania, and as far east as Ebensburg, Pennsylvania.  The chimney is no longer in use, as the gas flow from Unit 3 has been bypassed through a newer flue gas treatment system installed in 2002.

See also

 List of largest power stations in the United States
 List of power stations in Pennsylvania

References

External links
2005 toxic output numbers
Post Gazette article
Pennsylvania plant rankings

Energy infrastructure completed in 1969
Energy infrastructure completed in 1977
Towers completed in 1977
Chimneys in the United States
Coal-fired power stations in Pennsylvania
Buildings and structures in Indiana County, Pennsylvania